The Angry River (Chinese title: 鬼怒川) is a 1971 Hong Kong fantasy action film directed by Huang Feng. It was the first film produced by Golden Harvest.

Plot
Lan Tin-lung, master of the Liangyi Castle, calls upon all upright swordsmen to help wipe out the notorious Lunar Sect. But he is soon fatally wounded by the Sect's leader nicknamed King Hell. Lan's daughter, Lan Feng, sets out to find a precious herb capable of curing her dying father. The herb she eventually gets, leading her to a series of hectic confrontations with those who also covet the priceless medicine. She befriends Leng Yu-han, who saves her from being molested by a wicked man, Ma Ga Tueng, who is of the Hua Shan School. Lan Feng returns home to find the entire castle in an aftermath of the attack by Lunar Sect. Her father is among the dead. In a fit of despair, she swallows up the herb, and her ability tremendously strengthens up instantly. With Leng's help, she storms the stronghold of the Lunar Sect. King Hell is killed in the battle finally.

Cast
Chang I Fei
Chiang Nan 
Feng Yi
Han Ying Chieh
Sammo Hung
Kao Yuan
Lam Ching Ying
Angela Mao Ying
Pai Ying
Jackie Chan
Tommy Lee Gam Hing

External links
 The Angry River at HKcinemamagic.com

1970 films
Hong Kong fantasy films
1970s fantasy action films
1970s Mandarin-language films
Golden Harvest films
1970s Hong Kong films
Hong Kong action films